Sella is a municipality in the comarca of Marina Baixa in the province of Alicante, Spain. Every year the first weekend of October Sella celebrates its Festa Major; Festes de l'Aurora.

Description

Sella has one of the most important climbing areas in the Valencian Community, with a lot of high quality limestone rock and hundreds of bolted routes.

References

Municipalities in the Province of Alicante
Climbing areas of Spain